Mikhail Sergeyevich Sheremet (Russian: Михаил Сергеевич Шеремет; Ukrainian: Михайло Сергійович Шеремет; born 23 May 1971), is a Russian and former Ukrainian politician and former army officer who is a member of parliament of the State Duma of the VII convocation, and a member of the State Duma Committee on Energy since 5 October 2016.

He was the first Deputy Chairman of the Council of Ministers of the Republic of Crimea from 2014 to 2016.

Biography

Mikhail Sheremet was born on 23 May 1971.

In 1993, he received a higher military education, graduating from the Simferopol Higher Military-Political Construction School.

In 1995, he graduated from the retraining specialty "Financier" at the International Institute of Management, Business and Law of the International Academy of Sciences of San Marino (the institute was located in the city of Slavyansk, Ukraine, closed in 1996).

From 1988 to 1989, he worked at the Dzhankoy machine-building plant as an apprentice turner, turner. After graduating from a military school, he served in the Ukrainian army until 2002.

After dismissal from military service from 2002 to 2004, he worked in the Simferopol branch of the producer of wine and vodka products "Soyuz-Victan Ltd." as a security officer.

From 2004 to 2009, he worked at the Tavrida Corporation as Deputy President of the Corporation for Security and Safety.

From May to October 2009 he worked at Monolit-Plus LLC as a deputy director.

From 2009 to 2010, he worked in the open joint-stock company Simferopol Automobile Repair Plant named after Kuibyshev ”as Deputy Director for General Issues.

From 2010 to 2014, he worked in the Ukrainian political party "Russian Unity", headed the Simferopol city organization of the party.

In 2014, Sheremet was the commander of the people's militia of the Republic of Crimea.

From 2014 to 2016, Sheremet worked in the Council of Ministers of Crimea, as he hold the position of Deputy Chairman, then promoted First Deputy Chairman of the Council of Ministers.

In April 2014, he joined the United Russia party.

In 2018, he underwent retraining at the Russian Academy of National Economy and Public Administration under the President of Russia.

Legislative activity

From 2016 to 2019, during the term of office of a deputy of the State Duma of the VII convocation, he co-authored 136 legislative initiatives and amendments to draft federal laws.

Controversies

Beating a disabled person

In February 2019, Sheremet himself denied all charges, stating that he was far from the victim, Igor Nikitenko. In turn, Sheremet said that the visitor not only hit him, but also doused him with green stuff. The police were called to the scene. Currently, the Investigative Committee of Russia is examining the circumstances of the incident.

References

1971 births
Living people
People from Dzhankoy
United Russia politicians

Russian people of Ukrainian descent

Seventh convocation members of the State Duma (Russian Federation)
Eighth convocation members of the State Duma (Russian Federation)